Lian Ensemble is a Persian classical music ensemble based in Los Angeles, California, USA.

History 
The Lian Ensemble was established in 1996 by Pirayeh Pourafar, Houman Pourmehdi. The group has performed throughout the U.S. and internationally.

Style 
The Lian Ensemble is a group of performers and composers.
Their compositions fuse the Mystical Persian musical heritage with the contemporary sensibilities of postmodern Jazz.
Combining a musical vision with dedication to experimentation, they create a synthesis of mystical world music composed of traditional and folk melodies and instruments.

The Lian is composed of musicians whose diverse musical styles lend to this blend of Mystical world music.
Lian's music flows between a diverse range of styles and traditions, forging a sound that is all their own.
After much collaboration, the musicians have acquired the requisite knowledge of Persian music, and each adds their own distinctive rhythmic sounds to compositions, creating a mix of melodies.
In performance, Lian's ever-evolving repertoire of creative original music is expanded, rearranged, and examined with exploratory eyes at each and every concert.

On Lian ensemble
"The Lian Ensemble features the best Iranian musicians in the West"
GAVRIEL FISKE, The Jerusalem Post
The Lian Ensemble... World Class Persian Musicians. New sound  Music
Gifted World Music Group. Don Heckman, Los Angeles Times
Best World Music/ Recombinant Artist LAWMA 2004 & 2005, By John Payne LA WEEKLY

"The Lian Ensemble's concert was an exhilarating highlight of the triannual World Festival of Sacred Music"
Laurel Fishman, GRAMMY.com

"Painstakingly structured compositions with pounding rhythms"
Los Angeles Times

"combining intricate musical structure with an evocative blend of traditional and original compositions"
Laurel Fishman, GRAMMY.com

Discography
 "THE NAME OF THE BELOVED" (1998)
 "BANQUET IN THE TAVERN OF RUIN" (1999) 
 Dar Shekarestan (2000)
 "SYNCOPATION" (2001)
 The Call of Love (2001)
 Light and Fire (2002)
 Khake Heyran (2004)
 "The Hidden Sacred-Dark Wing" (2005)
 Pangea - The Tale of Unity (2006)
 The Window (2010)
 "Majnun" (2014)

Notes

See also
Music of Iran

External links
Official website
 Lian Ensemble Profile at last.fm

Iranian-American culture in Los Angeles
Persian classical music groups
Musical groups from Los Angeles
Musical groups established in 1993
Musicians of Iranian descent